Asheville–Buncombe Technical Community College (A-B Tech) is a public community college in Asheville, North Carolina. Established in 1959, the college is one of the oldest in the North Carolina Community College System and serves Buncombe and Madison counties across five different campuses, although students from anywhere may enroll. As of the 2014–15 school year, the curriculum enrollment was 10,070 and continuing education enrollment was 14,053 students. As of 2019–20, the college is the seventh largest in the North Carolina system and the largest in Western North Carolina. A-B Tech offers more than 120 degrees, diplomas, and certificates.

Academics

The first program offered by the college was Practical Nursing. Electronics Engineering Technology and the Machinist programs were started in 1960. Today, A-B Tech offers the associate degrees in Arts, Science, Fine Arts, and Engineering, over 30 college transfer pathways, and a number of one to two semester diplomas and certificates. There are numerous programs that are tied in with each of these degrees.

, approximately 23% of students at A-B Tech graduate with their associate degree, while others receive a certificate or diploma. Many attend for one or two years for general education credit before transferring to a four-year university to finish their course of study. A-B Tech has articulation agreements set up with every public 4-year university in the UNC system, and the school offers direct transfer programs in some of them. There are also opportunities available for juniors and seniors in high school to receive college credit before graduating that will transfer to a university, as well as an Early College program where high school students can receive a GED.

Accreditation programs recognizing A-B Tech include the Commission on Colleges of the Southern Association of Colleges and Schools, the North Carolina Board of Nursing, the National Accrediting Agency for Clinical Laboratory Sciences, the Joint Review Committee on Education Radiologic Technology, the American Dental Association, the Commission on Dental Accreditation, and the Accreditation Review Committee on Education in Surgical Technology.

Historic buildings

The Asheville–Buncombe Technical Community College main campus is on the former estate of Col. John Kerr, a veteran (Confederate) of the American Civil War. The 144-acre campus has historic buildings, including Ivy Hall, Fernihurst, the Smith-McDowell House and Sunnicrest.

Fernihurst, the former summer residence of Col. John Kerr, is a brick Italianate style house named after the Kerr family castle in Scotland. Located on a hill, south of the Smith-McDowell house, Fernihurst is part of A-B Tech Community College Culinary Arts Program.

The Smith-McDowell House, on the A-B Tech campus, was constructed in 1840 for James McConnell Smith. The house is the oldest brick building in Buncombe County and is currently a nonprofit museum that is included in the National Register of Historic Places.

Sunnicrest is one of five (and the only remaining) R.S. Smith-designed model cottages built by George Vanderbilt on Vernon Hill in what was then the town of Victoria. Sunnicrest houses the Human Resources Department of the A-B Tech Community College.

St. Genevieve-of-the-Pines, a Religious of Christian Education school, opened in 1908 and moved to the three-story 80-room former Victoria Inn in 1910, its third location. The school merged with Asheville Country Day School in 1987, creating Carolina Day School. A-B Tech bought the St. Genevieve campus while the new school at Asheville Country Day's campus. The only remaining building from St. Genevieve-of-the-Pines is Ivy Hall, an auditorium, gymnasium, and cafeteria built in 1936. A-B Tech announced plans in 2016 to renovate the structure for use as a public event space and College Advancement offices.

Notable alumni 
 Philip DeFranco - News commentator and YouTube personality, briefly attended A-B Tech
 Evan Golden - Professional wrestler, studied office administration and finance at A-B Tech

References

External links
 Official website

Two-year colleges in the United States
North Carolina Community College System colleges
Education in Asheville, North Carolina
Educational institutions established in 1959
Universities and colleges accredited by the Southern Association of Colleges and Schools
Buildings and structures in Asheville, North Carolina
1959 establishments in North Carolina